Jayson Scott Musson is an artist who lives and works in Brooklyn, NY.  He was born in Bronx, NY.

Early life

In an interview in Nat. Brut magazine, Musson said that he grew up in Spring Valley, New York, about 25 minutes from New York City.

He stated that he was "pretty much a very quiet kid" who "didn’t care too much for athletics or whatever, just drawing."

Education 
Musson earned a BFA in photography from the University of the Arts in Philadelphia, Pennsylvania. In 2011, he completed an MFA in painting from the University of Pennsylvania.

Music 
Musson is an original member of the Philadelphian rap group Plastic Little, formed during the summer of 2001. Along with Plastic Little, Musson performed with British producer Mark Ronson as well as collaborated with a number of notable Philadelphian acts including Spank Rock and Amanda Blank.

Video Performance 
In 2010, Musson created the character of Hennessy Youngman, which subsequently became an Internet phenomenon through the popularity of the "Art Thoughtz" video series. Musson publicly divides his persona with the character's by referring to Youngman as his "cousin." Musson's "ART THOUGHTZ" series is distributed internationally by  Electronic Arts Intermix.

Solo exhibitions
 2012: Fleisher/Ollman Gallery, Philadelphia, PA "A True Fiend's Weight"
 2012: Salon 94, New York, NY, "Halcyon Days"
 2011: Pennsylvania Academy of the Fine Arts, Philadelphia, PA "Hennessy Youngman & Nathaniel Snerpus Present: The Grand Manner"
 2011: Marginal Utility Gallery, Philadelphia, PA, "Neoteny: The Hard Sell"
 2008: Dazed & Confused Magazine Gallery, London, England,  "Too Black For BET"
 2006: Space 1026, Philadelphia, PA, "Too Black for BET, Episode II: The Black Boy George"
 2002: Space 1026, Philadelphia, PA, "Too Black for BET"

References 

Year of birth missing (living people)
Living people
People from the Bronx
African-American contemporary artists
American contemporary artists
Artists from Philadelphia
University of Pennsylvania School of Design alumni
21st-century African-American people